The Men's points race competition at the 2020 UCI Track Cycling World Championships was held on 28 February 2020.

Results
The race was started at 18:32.

References

Men's points race
UCI Track Cycling World Championships – Men's points race